Königsbrunn (Swabian: Kenigsbrunn) is the largest town in the district of Augsburg, in Bavaria, Germany. It is situated on the left bank of the Lech, approx. 10 km south of Augsburg.

History
Königsbrunn is one of the youngest settlements in Bavaria. It became an independent commune in 1842 and obtained the municipal law 125 years later, in 1967.
In 1688 the bishop built a custom house at the crossroad of  Via Claudia, which is called the "Neuhaus" (meaning new house). It is the oldest building of the young city.

Politics

The local elections of 2014 produced the following result:

 CSU: 12 seats (-5)
 SPD: 6 seats (+2)
 Free Voters: 6 seats (+2)
 Alliance 90/The Greens: 3 seats (=)
 Independents: 2 seats (+2)
 FDP/Bürgerforum: 1 seats (-1)

Mayors since 1900
 1900–1911: Johannes Wahl
 1912–1924: Jakob Pfitzenmaier
 1935–1945: Jakob Schreijak
 1945: Hermann Herget
 1945–1948: Xaver Salvamoser
 1948–1984: Fritz Wohlfarth 
 1984–1996: Adam Metzner (CSU)
 1996–2014: Ludwig Fröhlich 
 since 2014: Franz Feigl (born 1970) (CSU)

Public safety

Police
The responsible police station for Königsbrunn is the police station of Bobingen.

Rescue service
To Königsbrunn the ambulance comes from Bobingen, Haunstetten or Mering, normally.

Fire brigade
The fire station of the volunteer fire brigade of Königsbrunn is located at St.-Johannes-Straße 42 in Königsbrunn. Here a Löschzug (platoon for fire fighting) and a Rüstzug (platoon for technical help, e.g. road accidents) are stationed. There is no fixed area of responsibility. The public-safety answering point (PSAP) of Augsburg is responsible for alerting the fire brigade. The PSAP is always alerting the closest rescue vehicle to an emergency. Administrative borders like counties etc. do not matter here. The area of operation is about Königbrunn itself including the 4 lane B17 and for support the towns around.

Attractions
Mercateum, the world's biggest globe to rely on a historical map

Twin towns – sister cities

Königsbrunn is twinned with:
 Rab, Croatia

Notable people
Wolfgang Knabe (born 1950), cultural scientist and expedition leader
Darius Kampa (born 1977), football player and manager
Markus Thorandt (born 1981), footballer
Steffen Tölzer (born 1985), ice hockey player

References

External links
 

Augsburg (district)